Pedro Sernagiotto, also known as Pietro Sernagiotto or Ministrinho (born November 17, 1908 in São Paulo; died April 5, 1965 in São Paulo) was an Italian Brazilian professional football player. He also held Italian citizenship and on October 22, 1933 played for the Italian national B team against Hungary.

Honours
 Serie A champion: 1932/33, 1933/34.

1908 births
1965 deaths
Brazilian footballers
Italian footballers
Brazilian people of Italian descent
Serie A players
Sociedade Esportiva Palmeiras players
Juventus F.C. players
Association football midfielders
Footballers from São Paulo